Days of the New (also known as the Green album or Days of the New II) is the second self-titled album of Louisville rock band Days of the New. Released on August 31, 1999, it marks the first album following the break up of the original lineup and the last under Outpost. While not nearly as commercially successful as its 1997 predecessor, Green acquired stronger appreciation from critics and featured two successful singles.

Overview
Shortly after finishing their 1998 tour with Metallica and Jerry Cantrell, after much turmoil, the original Days of the New split up. Todd Whitener, Matt Taul, and Jesse Vest would go on to form Tantric while Meeks carried on the Days of the New name. In February 1999, it was reported that while his ex-bandmates were looking for a new singer, Meeks was finishing up work on a second album tentatively titled Days of the New 2 with an expected release in late spring or early summer that year. He eventually formed a new band lineup and hired an orchestra for his sophomore effort.

In contrast to the debut album, which has a more stripped down acoustic style, Green incorporates many different elements, namely an orchestra and female backing vocals. The darker song writing is also deemphasized in favor of more upbeat melodies as seen in "Flight Response" and "Take Me Back Then." Many of the album's songs contain intros and codas to seamlessly carry into the next song. While largely maintaining the acoustic feel of its predecessor (as evidenced by the folk number "Provider") Green even utilizes electronic percussion more commonly found in dance club music, particularly in the track "Enemy." This song, along with "Weapon and the Wound," became the album's radio singles.

A young Nicole Scherzinger put her studies at Wright State University on hold to sing backing vocals for Green. Meeks noted that he wanted a female singer to "deliver some more world/operatic textures and sounds" and that her contributions were not buried in the back but instead featured prominently alongside his. Scherzinger performs on “Flight Response,” “The Real,” “Take Me Back Then,” “Phobics of Tragedy,” “Bring Yourself,” and “Last One.” Meeks claims that after touring for the album, the two grew apart creatively and that despite being an "amazing entertainer," she "didn’t seem to understand music very well."

Touring and promotion
In June 1999, the band was tentatively planned to tour in Europe in September before a lengthy US tour in the summer of 2000, but this did not pan out. Meeks debuted his new seven-member band lineup on September 4, 1999 at the Ear Xtacy store in Louisville. According to Pollstar, the official tour would begin in Pensacola, Florida on October 22; however, Yahoo! Music stated that same day that touring would run from October 21 in Chattanooga, Tennessee through November 27 in Louisville, Kentucky. The concerts exhibited "more of a dramatic show" and "more of a choreographed direction" compared to previous Days of the New tours. This included backdrop screen, stage props, and other effects and, in the words of Travis Meeks, wouldn't be "just a rock 'n' roll show" but " more of a sensory-experience thing."

According to Meeks, the band toured for two months in support of Green after which he and Scherzinger had a "small fling." Despite her already having a boyfriend, Meeks admits to having had a crush on her during this period. He later expressed interest in working with her again on his much delayed Days of the New Presents Tree Colors.

Green features two singles. Its lead, "Enemy," charted well and gained music video rotation on MTV. The track introduced Day of the New's new sound to the mainstream with its unique blend of acoustic and electronic elements. A second single, "Weapon and the Wound," features a somber ballad approach heavily showcasing the clarinet. It charted at #10 on Mainstream Rock Tracks but did not achieve the success of its predecessor.

Reception

Critics were fairly enthusiastic of Green. Allmusic's Stephen Thomas Erlewine named it an AMG Album Pick and praised Meeks' production abilities, calling it a "definite improvement from his debut." Tom Lanham of Entertainment Weekly gave it a B grade and noted, "Like Roger Waters, [Meeks] toys with colorful tones and textures and waxes ponderous in a schoolmaster baritone. Some tracks stumble awkwardly, but inventive oomph pulls this naif through."

Despite better critical reception, Green sold poorly compared to the first album. By October 1999, it had sold only 124,000 copies according to SoundScan. It would eventually reach around 450,000 copies sold. Only one song, "Enemy", was a major hit, and the second single, a ballad entitled "Weapon and the Wound," charted reasonably well.

Track listing
All songs written by Travis Meeks except where noted.
 "Flight Response" – 5:55
 "The Real" (Meeks, Todd Whitener) – 4:18
 "Enemy" – 5:11
 "Weapon & the Wound" – 5:44
 "Skeleton Key" – 3:02
 "Take Me Back Then" – 4:16
 "Bring Yourself" – 5:55
 "I Think" – 5:51
 "Longfellow" – 1:56
 "Intro" – 1:42
 "Phobics of Tragedy" – 3:26
 "Not the Same" – 4:24
 "Provider" – 5:53
 "Last One" (Meeks, Whitener) – 4:37

Outtakes 
 "The Sun"
 "Requiem" - unreleased coda

Personnel 
 Travis Meeks: lead vocals, guitar
 Max Maxwell: drums
 Pete Peterson: arrangements
 Peter Rhee: drums
 Ray Rizzo: percussion
 Nicole Scherzinger: backing vocals
 Carl Shields: drums
 Matt Taul: drums
 Alex Tench: backing vocals
 Brian Vinson: bass
 Orchestra
 Conducted and arranged: Suzie Katayama
 Members: Rick Baptist, Charles Boito, Eve Butler, Jon Clarke, Larry Corbett, Mario DeLeon, Joel Derouin, Virginia Frazer, Matthew J. Funes, Geraldo Hilera, Steven M. Holtman, Ronald Janelli, John T. Johnson, Renita Koven, Daniel Smith, David Stone, John Wittenberg, and Phillip E. Yao
 Choir
 Sandie Hall, Linda Harmon, Luana Jackman, Victor Janacua, Bob Joyce, Jon Joyce, Rick Logan, Suzie Katayama, Donna Medina, and Oren Waters

Production credits 
 Produced by Travis Meeks and Todd Smith
 Engineered by Todd Smith with Mike Baker and Clark Hagan
 Mixed by Scott Litt, Travis Meeks, Todd Smith
 Digital Engineer: Greg Fidelman
 Second Engineers: Victor Janacua, Bill McCord, Al Sanderson, Alex Tench

Artwork 
 Creative Direction: Jeral Tidwell
 Art and Digital Direction: Chip Dumstorf
 Illustrations: Jeral Tidwell
 Graphic Design: Chip Dumstorf and Travis Meeks
 Photography: Theresa Carpenter, Chaz Rough, and Larry Smith

Charts
Singles - Billboard (North America)

References

1999 albums
Days of the New albums
Geffen Records albums
World music albums by American artists